The first London and North Eastern Railway (LNER) Class A2 was a class of 4-6-2 steam locomotive designed by Vincent Raven for the North Eastern Railway (as NER class 4.6.2). Two were built by the NER in 1922 before the grouping and another three by the LNER in 1924.  Their LNER numbers were 2400–2404. All five locomotives were named by the LNER.

Origins
The NER was the largest and most prosperous of the railway companies that would make up the LNER from 1923 and provided the general manager of the new railway company. However the chief mechanical engineer of the NER, Sir Vincent Raven was at retirement age and the new post was eventually offered to Nigel Gresley of the Great Northern Railway. He had introduced a powerful new A1 Class Pacific in April 1922, and Raven was anxious to show that the NER could keep up with the race for increased power. Raven's rival design was authorised at the same time as the introduction of the A1 class publicised in the railway press in July 1922 although the first two examples did not appear from Darlington Railway Works until late December, and only one of them ran before the beginnings of the LNER.

Design
The new class was an enlarged version of the successful Z class Atlantics (later LNER C7 class) with a larger boiler, larger cylinders and wide firebox. Also, because of the great length of their parallel boilers, the locomotives earned the nickname 'Skittle-alleys'. The locomotives were originally built with NER 6-wheel tenders, but they were replaced by Gresley 8-wheel "new type" non-corridor tenders in 1934–35.

Components for three  further examples of the class had been prepared by Darlington works, and construction of these was authorised in February 1923. This was the same month that Nigel Gresley took up office and may have been ordered without his knowledge.  These locomotives appeared in March 1924. However, comparative trials between the first two examples of the A1 and A2 classes conducted in the summer of 1923 showed that the A1 was a more technically advanced machine and no more Raven A2s were built. Thus the A1 was chosen as the LNER's standard express passenger locomotive.

Performance
The performance of the locomotives was adequate for the needs of their intended use on the East Coast Main Line between York and Edinburgh but disappointing and with higher coal consumption compared to the A1 class. They also suffered from a long wheelbase  which limited their route availability elsewhere.

In an attempt to improve the steaming of the class Gresley rebuilt No. 2404 with an A1-style taper boiler in 1929, reducing the boiler pressure to  but no noticeable improvement was achieved. Therefore, once the locomotives came due for heavy repair during 1936-37 they were all withdrawn from service and scrapped.

Assessment
According to the Railway Correspondence and Travel Society survey of the Locomotives of the L.N.E.R. 'the design was an unhappy swan-song to the North Eastern locomotive development - it was their biggest, but somewhat below the best that Darlington could do.' In the opinion of Allen, 'prestige rather than real need was the predominant consideration; in the design.

Stock list

Notes

References

External links
 LNER Encyclopedia Class A2
 

4.6.2.
A2 Raven
LNER A2 Raven
Railway locomotives introduced in 1922
Scrapped locomotives
Standard gauge steam locomotives of Great Britain
2′C1′ h3 locomotives